The Arras-class, sometimes known as the Amiens class, were a series of aviso (also referred to as sloops) built for the French Navy at the end of World War I.

Design and development

A total of forty three fast "first-rate" avisos for convoy escort duties. These ships were ordered under 1916 and 1917 building programmes for the French Navy and all were named after places on the Western Front lines. Built in nine different military and civilian dockyards across France, The first of which, Arras, entered commission May 1918. The signing of the Armistice of 11 November 1918 marked the end of the First World War, and the final thirteen planned Arras-class ships were cancelled. The remaining ships were slowly completed from 1919 to 1924.

The ships were modelled after the success of British Q-ships, military ships purposely designed to resemble three-island type merchant cargo ships to deceive enemy U-boats. As such, like merchant ships they were considered roomy for their size and remained dry in head seas.

The majority of the ships were powered by oil-fired twin-shaft Parsons steam turbines engines and carried  of fuel oil. The exceptions were Craonne, Liévin, Montmirail, Mondement, Baccarat and Bethune which were coal-fired and carried  of coal and had two du Temple boilers or Normand boilers. Oil-fired ships were faster, and capable of reaching s while coal-fired ships were slower.

The Arras-class were armed with two single /55 Modèle 1910 guns in unshielded mounts mounted at the bow and stern. Secondary armament consisted of a single /62.5 Modèle 1908 gun on a central high-angled mount as anti-aircraft artillery. Initially armed with four single /80 Modèle 1914 machine guns, these were later replaced with four single 13.2 mm/76 Modèle 1929 machine guns. Some ships were briefly armed with two single /48.5 Modèle 1916 Army-pattern guns.

Ships completed before the end of the war participated in the trans-Atlantic convoys. In the Interwar period the avisos Belfort, Épernay, Lunéville, Péronne, Revigny in November 1927 and Reims in 1928, were loaned to the Compagnie générale aéropostale. While in Compagnie générale aéropostale service Épernay caught fire and was destroyed off of Natal in 1930. The surviving ships were returned to French naval service in 1931. Bar-le-Duc foundered and was stricken off of Lesbos while escorting Wrangel's fleet during the Allied intervention in the Russian Civil War in 1920. Other ships were reassigned to a variety of duties. Les Éparges and Ypres were disarmed and converted to Survey vessels. Vauquois and Remiremont were used as Training ships. Bapaume was temporarily given a flight deck from bow to bridge for takeoff training for French Naval Aviation under a plan devised by naval aviation pioneer Paul Teste between 1920 and 1924. Belfort was converted to a seaplane tender.

At the start of the Second World War in 1939, nineteen Arras-class avisos had been retired and only eleven still remained in active service. Several ships of the class were active in the evacuation of Allied Forces after the collapse of France in June 1940. One of which, Vauquois was sunk by a naval mine on 18 June 1940. After the Armistice of 22 June 1940 was signed between Nazi Germany and the French Third Republic, the French navy became split in two. French navy ships in British ports were interned and soon passed to the fledgling Free French Naval Forces. These were Amiens, Arras, Belfort, Coucy, and Epinal. Those ships still in France and her colonial empire swore allegiance to the new collaborationist Vichy French government of Philippe Pétain. Calais participated in the defence of Dakar in September 1940. Tahure, which was stationed in Vichy-controlled French Indochina during the French-Thai war and participated in the Battle of Koh Chang on 17 January 1941. While in Vichy French service, Lassigny was retired in 1941 and Ypres (formerly Dunkerque) was retired April 1942. Les Éparges was scuttled in Toulon on 27 November 1942 but was raised by Germany and converted to a minesweeper. She was renamed M6060 and commissioned into the Kriegsmarine on 5 May 1943. She was in the process of being converted to an escort shipped and renamed SG25 when she caught fire and work on her was abandoned 1 March 1944.

After the war the surviving ships of the class were returned to France and broken up, the last remaining Arras-class ship, Amiens was scrapped 13 October 1949.

Ships
Cancelled ships were Betheny, Chalons, Château-Thierry, Compiègne, Douaumont, Fère-Champenoise, Gerbeviller, Noyon, Roye, Saint-Dié, Senlis, Soissons and Souchez.

See also
Q-ship
Merchant raider

References

Sloop classes
 
Ship classes of the French Navy